Greenleaf is an unincorporated community in Meeker County, Minnesota, United States, near Litchfield and Cedar Mills.  The community is located along Meeker County Road 18 near State Highway 22 (MN 22).

Greenleaf is located within Ellsworth Township and Greenleaf Township.

History
Greenleaf was platted in 1859 by William Henry Greenleaf, who became a State Senator, and named for him. A post office was established at Greenleaf in 1860, and remained in operation until it was discontinued in 1906.

References

Former municipalities in Minnesota
Unincorporated communities in Minnesota
Unincorporated communities in Meeker County, Minnesota